Earth Fare is an American health and wellness supermarket with 20 locations in 8 states throughout the Southeast United States. It sells natural and organic food that the company claimed to have the highest product standards in the United States (free of various artificial additives, high-fructose corn syrup, hormones and antibiotics), and was one of the largest natural and organic food retailers in the country. After closing all stores in February 2020, three locations reopened in June 2020 and a total of 20 locations operate as of March 2021.

History 

Founded by Roger Derrough in 1975, the first store opened its doors in Asheville, North Carolina as “Dinner for the Earth”. Initially, Dinner for the Earth offered only organic dried bulk foods in wood barrels and wellness products on handmade shelves. With new partner Randy Talley, the store rebranded as Earth Fare in a new larger location in 1994, transitioning from a specialty store to a full-service store with expanded offerings of products, like craft beer and artisanal cheeses. Two years later, the store expanded to a second location in Charleston, South Carolina, and thereafter continued its expansion to "mid-sized metros, with the savvy and wealth to support a healthy supermarket and no competition in the niche."

Oak Hill Capital bought the chain in 2012. The company maintains a list of 140 ingredients that its products do not contain, and customers may receive $50 gift cards if they spot one of said ingredients in one of the chain's products.

On February 3, 2020, Earth Fare announced that it was going out of business and liquidating all of its stores. The company cited "continued challenges in the retail industry" as a reason it could not refinance its outstanding debt, further adding that it was "not in a financial position to continue to operate on a go forward basis." One day later, the company announced that it had filed for Chapter 11 bankruptcy protection in the U.S. Bankruptcy Court in Wilmington, Delaware. It listed liabilities of $100 million to $500 million and assets of $100 million to $500 million. All locations closed by February 25, 2020.

Products
All products the store carried were free of high fructose corn syrup, artificial fats, artificial trans fats, artificial colors, artificial flavors, artificial preservatives, artificial sweeteners, bleached or bromated flour, never administered antibiotics or added growth hormones. The company claims to have the highest standard in its organic produce in North America.

While it sold food from around the world, the company also operated the policy of "100 mile Commitment" to sell as much local produce as possible from within a 100-mile radius of the store.

Store locations
At its peak, Earth Fare operated 50 stores locations across 10 states: Alabama, Florida, Georgia, Indiana, Michigan, North Carolina, Ohio, South Carolina, Tennessee and Virginia. As of February 2021, the chain currently operates 20 locations across 8 states: Georgia, North Carolina, South Carolina, Virginia, Tennessee, Florida, Ohio, and Michigan.

Expansion and decline
Earth Fare expanded into Virginia in November 2017 with three locations in Roanoke, Fairfax, and Williamsburg. In 2019, Earth Fare had planned fifty additional stores by 2024.

In 2018, Earth Fare closed two locations in Atlanta, Georgia, and one location in Columbus, Ohio. Earth Fare's Gainesville, Florida and Fairfax, Virginia locations closed in January 2020.

Reopening
Just four months after shuttering the entire chain, an investment from Hulsing Enterprises of Asheville, North Carolina, and its CEO Dennis Hulsing helped the original Earth Fare founders Randy Talley and Mike Cianciarulo, to revive the brand and begin to reopen certain locations. First to reopen was the Westgate Earth Fare in Asheville on June 22. The second and third locations to reopen are in Roanoke, Virginia, and Boone, North Carolina, with five other locations earmarked to resume operations in Athens, Georgia, Summerville, South Carolina, and Rock Hill, South Carolina. Most of the other former Earth Fare locations in the Southeastern U.S. were sold to other retailers during the bankruptcy proceedings earlier in 2020.

The chain also announced its first completely new location—as opposed to a reopening of a shuttered location—will open in early 2021 in Christiansburg, Virginia. In February 2022, an e-mail was sent to Earth Fare customers stating that the store in Saint Johns, Florida, was closing just months after re-opening; on February 17, 2022, liquidation sales began at 50% off storewide.

References

External links
 

Companies based in Asheville, North Carolina
Defunct companies based in North Carolina
Economy of the Southeastern United States
Defunct supermarkets of the United States
Organic food retail organizations
Companies that filed for Chapter 11 bankruptcy in 2020
Retail companies established in 1975
American companies established in 1975
1975 establishments in North Carolina
Retail companies disestablished in 2020
American companies disestablished in 2020
2020 disestablishments in North Carolina